Mathematically Gifted & Black (MGB) is a website that features the accomplishments of black scholars in mathematical sciences. In addition to highlighting the work and lives of established mathematicians in the African Diaspora, the platform aims to support the next generation of these mathematicians as they pursue career goals in mathematics and mathematical sciences fields. Featured mathematicians must have a degree in mathematics that they use in their work and be recognized as a leader in research, education, industry, government, academia, and/or outreach. The website has been recognized by the American Mathematical Society (AMS) as a "celebrat[ion of] the diversity of Black mathematicians," and the National Math Festival describes it as a resource that "provides access to the diverse and dynamic community of black mathematicians." When featured on the mathematics podcast "Relatively Prime," the founders of MGB shared that the website shows the diversity of black mathematicians' lives and highlights the importance of representation in mathematics. Founders of MGB received the Association for Women in Mathematics’ 2022 AWM Presidential Recognition Award.

History 
Mathematically Gifted & Black was founded in 2017 by Erica Graham (Bryn Mawr College), Raegan Higgins (Texas Tech University), Candice Price (Smith College), and Shelby Wilson (University of Maryland). The professors created the website with the intent of highlighting the contributions and lives of black mathematicians. The name of the website was partially inspired by the song "To Be Young, Gifted and Black" performed by Nina Simone with lyrics by Weldon Irvine.

Notable people recognized 
Mathematically Gifted & Black features a collective archive called the "Circle of Excellence" that documents the website's Black History Month honorees that have been recognized since the site's inception. During the month of February, a prominent black mathematician is recognized each day, their accomplishments are highlighted, and a short Q&A with the recipient is often included. The mathematicians featured by MGB include university professors and a diverse variety of mathematical professionals.

Several notable individuals are included among the extensive archive of honorees. Their names appear below.

2022 Black History Month Honorees

Johnny Earl Brown
Kyndall Allen Brown
Tianna Burke
Bronte Burleigh-Jones
Jamylle Carter
Adrian Coles
Nathaniel Dean
Dan Eckhardt
Stacey D. Finley
Uduak George
Isaac Harris
Jacqueline Milton Hicks
Joseph Johnson
Genevieve Knight
Camille A. McKayle
Christian McRoberts
Cassandra McZeal
Janis M. Oldham
Ronald Page II
Kendra E. Pleasant
Sandra Richardson
Aqeeb Sabree
Machell Town
Ashley Wheeler
Brandis Whitfield
Bryan Williams
Jahmario Williams
Pamela Williams
Shelby Wilson
Abubakarr Yillah

2021 Black History Month Honorees

Khalilah Beal-Uribe
Wako Tasisa Bungula
Robert Berry
Cory Colbert
Keisha Cook
Ranthony A.C. Edmonds
Geremias Polanco Encarnacion
Gloria F. Gilmer
Piper Harron
Roderick Holmes
Nicole Michelle Joseph
Lester Mackey
Reginald RB McGee
Brittany L. Mosby
Virginia Newell
Jean Pierre Mutanguha
Marieme Ngom
Dionne Price
Olivia Prosper
Annie T. Randall
Angela Robinson
James L. Solomon
Ashley J. Swain
Dionne Swift
Dante A. Tawfeeq
David S. Torain II
Rachel E. Vincent-Finley
Shanise Walker

2020 Black History Month Honorees

 Nathan Alexander
 Karen D. King
 Omayra Ortega
 Aissa Wade
 Bobby Wilson

2019 Black History Month Honorees

 Naiomi Cameron
 Melvin Currie
 Christina Eubanks-Turner
 Evelyn Boyd Granville
 Shelly M. Jones
 Mark E. Lewis
 Dawn Lott
 Anisah N. Nu'Man
 Kasso Okoudjou
 Erica N. Walker
 Kimberly Weems
 Floyd Williams

2018 Black History Month Honorees

 Ron Buckmire
 Monica Cox
 Gloria Conyers Hewitt
 Raegan Higgins
 Rudy Horne
 Carolyn Mahoney
 William A. Massey
 Bonita V. Saunders
 Jeanette Scissum
 Kimberly Sellers
 Clarence F. Stephens
 Talitha Washington

2017 Black History Month Honorees

 Sylvia Bozeman
 Carla Cotwright-Williams
 Sylvester James Gates
 Linda B. Hayden
 Freeman A. Hrabowski III
 Jacqueline Hughes-Oliver
 Fern Hunt
 Tasha Inniss
 Trachette Jackson
 Raymond L. Johnson
 Shirley McBay
 Ronald E. Mickens
 Mohamed Omar
 Arlie Petters
 Chelsea Walton
 Suzanne Weekes
 Scott W. Williams
 Talithia Williams
 Ulrica Wilson

References

External links 

 Mathematically Gifted & Black

Internet properties established in 2016
Mathematics websites
American educational websites